Irina Maracheva (born 29 September 1984) is a Russian athlete who competes in middle-distance running events. She has a personal best time of 1:57.82 minutes at the 800 metres.

Maracheva won the bronze medal at the 2012 European Athletics Championships in Helsinki at the 800 metres event.

On 25 January 2016 it was announced that she had been banned from competition for doping for 2 years by the Russian Olympic Committee.

Competition record

References

External links 
 

1984 births
Living people
Russian female middle-distance runners
European Athletics Championships medalists
Doping cases in athletics
Russian sportspeople in doping cases
Competitors at the 2009 Summer Universiade